The Capture, published in 1997 and written by K. A. Applegate, is the sixth book in the Animorphs series. It is narrated by Jake. The Capture was re-released by Scholastic in March 2012.

Plot summary
The Animorphs morph cockroaches in order to infiltrate a meeting of The Sharing.  They discover that the Yeerks have infested an entire hospital staff and are using them to turn patients into Controllers.  Not only that, but next week their state's governor – who is a potential Presidential candidate – will be checking in for surgery.

The Animorphs morph houseflies to infiltrate the hospital, and discover a Jacuzzi that has been converted into a miniature Yeerk Pool.  Jake demorphs to human and turns the Jacuzzi on to kill the Yeerks, but the Animorphs are discovered by the Controllers.  In the subsequent fight Jake is hit by a bullet ricochet and his head falls in the boiling pool.  He is infested by a Yeerk named Temrash 114.

The Animorphs escape from the hospital into the woods, and Jake panics as he realizes that none of his friends have noticed anything different about him.  Ax notices something amiss in Temrash's initial reaction to him and accuses Jake of being a Controller.  Temrash loses his cool and insults Ax, calling him "Andalite filth" and the others realize he is indeed a Controller.

The others decide to hold Jake/Temrash for three days until Temrash dies of Kandrona starvation. In the meantime, Ax morphs Jake and takes his place at home and school.  The others tie Jake to a chair in an abandoned shack out in the forest, but Temrash still has access to all of Jake's morphs.  He morphs to tiger in the night and escapes.  He becomes lost in the forest and morphs to falcon and tries to fly away, but Cassie stops him as a great horned owl.

Temrash morphs to wolf and again tries to escape, but is stopped by the rival wolf pack from The Encounter. Rachel escorts him back to the shack in elephant morph.

Temrash begins to taunt Jake, revealing that he was once the Yeerk controlling Jake's brother Tom. Jake tells him that he will never give up.

The next morning Temrash again tries to escape, this time as an ant, but is forced back by an enemy ant colony.  Temrash begins to die of Kandrona starvation.  As he does, Jake witnesses his pain, and in the final hours catches his first terrifying glimpse of Crayak, though Jake does not know what this strange creature is. 

Jake returns to his family to find that he has apparently been acting strangely lately, because Ax is not used to being in human morph.  A few days later he morphs partway to wolf (to disguise his voice) and telephones Tom to give him a message of hope.

Morphs

TV series
This book formed the basis for the episodes "The Capture: Part 1" and "The Capture: Part 2". While this followed the storyline fairly faithfully, there were still a number of changes made.

In the book, Jake and the others discover the existence of the clinic through Tom dialling various doctors at home and at a meeting for the Sharing. In the TV series, he learns about the clinic through his parents and their meeting with Visser Three/Victor Trent. Jake's dad is later found out to be involved in running the clinic in the TV series.
Ax shows an odd ability in the TV series, which is not present in the books. In this case, he is able to demagnetize a card and turn it into a card that works on any standard card reader.
In the books they morph flies. In the TV series, they morph into cockroaches (they do morph into cockroaches in the books, but not to examine the facility) and are almost stepped on.
Jake's Yeerk is not named in the TV series.
In the book, Jake morphs into several animals while under Yeerk control. In the TV series, he only morphs into one animal to escape his chair he is bound to.
In the book, Jake is taken to an old shack out in the woods near Cassie's house, while in the TV series, Jake is just held at the barn.
In the book, Jake partly morphs a wolf to disguise his voice to Tom over the telephone. In the TV episode, he has Ax rewire a telephone to be untraceable and electronically disguise his voice.

Re-release
Scholastic has re-released this book with a lenticular cover in March 2012.

References

External links
Official page at Scholastic.com

Animorphs books
1997 American novels
1997 science fiction novels